The American Cardinals Dinner is an annual fundraiser that benefits The Catholic University of America (CUA).  Each year, a different U.S. archdiocese hosts the Cardinals Dinner, a black-tie event which traditionally features all or most of the cardinals who serve as residential or emeritus archbishops of various U.S. dioceses.  It is traditionally preceded by a Mass at the local cathedral.

2016
The American Cardinals Dinner was not held in 2016.  Instead, the financial support that would have gone toward a dinner in 2016 was to be directed toward supporting the 2016 visit of Pope Francis to the Catholic University campus, which was a very special and significant event for the University.

26th annual dinner (2015)
The 2015 dinner was held in St. Louis, Missouri, with the Mass celebrated at Cathedral Basilica of St. Louis.  The Cardinals that attended were: Sean O'Malley O.F.M. Cap., Archbishop of Boston; Daniel N. DiNardo, Archbishop of Galveston-Houston; Donald W. Wuerl, Archbishop of Washington; Timothy M. Dolan, Archbishop of New York; Theodore McCarrick, Archbishop Emeritus of Washington; and Justin Rigali, Archbishop Emeritus of Philadelphia.  The event was hosted by Archbishop Robert J. Carlson, Archbishop of St. Louis and John Garvey, President of The Catholic University of America.  Mr. and Mrs. Charles Drury were co-chairs of the dinner and were honored with the Archbishop’s Appreciation Award.

The dinner was held at The Ritz-Carlton St. Louis and raised over $1.1 million, which goes directly to support scholarships for students at The Catholic University of America.

25th annual dinner (2014)
The 2014 dinner was held in New York City, with the Mass celebrated at St. Patrick's Cathedral with Cardinal Timothy Dolan serving as homilist.  The dinner raised a record $2.1 million to support scholarships.

20th annual dinner (2009)
The 20th annual dinner was held in Houston, Texas, at the Hyatt Regency Houston and was co-hosted by Very Rev. David M. O'Connell, C.M., president of the University, and Daniel Cardinal DiNardo, archbishop of Galveston-Houston. Over 700 guests attended the gala, at which Angela House, a transitional-housing facility for women after incarceration, received the American Cardinals Encouragement Award. Sister Maureen O'Connell, O.P., president of Angela House, accepted the award and $10,000 grant on behalf of the Houston-based organization.

The Mass preceding the dinner was held at the Co-Cathedral of the Sacred Heart, with Cardinal DiNardo as the principal celebrant and Father O'Connell as the homilist. The principal concelebrants were Francis Cardinal George, O.M.I., archbishop of Chicago; Roger Cardinal Mahony, archbishop of Los Angeles; Justin Cardinal Rigali, archbishop of Philadelphia; Seán Cardinal O’Malley, O.F.M. Cap., archbishop of Boston;  William Cardinal Keeler, archbishop emeritus of Baltimore; Adam Cardinal Maida, archbishop emeritus of Detroit; Edward Cardinal Egan, archbishop emeritus of New York; Archbishop Pietro Sambi, apostolic nuncio to the United States; and Father O'Connell.

Other prelates concelebrating were Archbishop Donald Wuerl, archbishop of Washington and chancellor of CUA, along with Archbishop Emeritus Joseph Fiorenza, Auxiliary Bishop Joe S. Vásquez, and Auxiliary Bishop Emeritus Vincent M. Rizzotto of Galveston-Houston and Auxiliary Bishop Oscar Cantú of the Archdiocese of San Antonio.

17th annual dinner (2006)
At the 2006 dinner, a gift of $8,000,000 from the Knights of Columbus was announced, to renovate Keane Hall and rename it McGivney Hall after Father Michael J. McGivney, who founded the Knights in 1882 in New Haven, Conn.

Past dinners
December 12, 1989, in Washington, D.C.
January 18, 1991, in New York, New York
January 11, 1992, in Chicago, Illinois
April 24, 1993, in Boston, Massachusetts
April 16, 1994, in Washington, D.C.
February 25, 1995, in Philadelphia, Pennsylvania
April 19, 1996, in Los Angeles, California
June 6, 1997, in Detroit, Michigan
May 1, 1998, in Baltimore, Maryland
April 23, 1999, in Boston, Massachusetts
May 5, 2000, in Chicago, Illinois
April 27, 2001, in New York, New York
April 26, 2002, in Philadelphia, Pennsylvania
May 2, 2003, in San Francisco, California
April 23, 2004, in Saint Paul–Minneapolis, Minnesota
January 28, 2005, in Miami, Florida
April 28, 2006, in Washington, D.C.
April 27, 2007, in Las Vegas, Nevada
April 25, 2008, in Boston, Massachusetts
April 24, 2009, in Houston, Texas
April 23, 2010 in Atlanta, Georgia
May 6, 2011, in Phoenix, Arizona
April 27, 2012, in Chicago, Illinois
May 10, 2013, in Washington, D.C.
May 30, 2014 in New York, New York
April 24, 2015 in St. Louis, Missouri
 May 5, 2017 - Location TBD
 April 27, 2018 - Location TBD

See also
List of the Catholic bishops of the United States
List of living cardinals (by name, country, birthdate)
College of Cardinals
Catholic Church hierarchy
Bishop (Catholic Church)

References

External links
American Cardinals Dinner official webpage (CUA)

Catholic Church in the United States

Catholic University of America